Pericles Fouro da Silva (born ) is a Brazilian male artistic gymnast and part of the national team. He participated at the 2015 World Artistic Gymnastics Championships in Glasgow.

References

1989 births
Living people
Brazilian male artistic gymnasts
Place of birth missing (living people)
Gymnasts at the 2011 Pan American Games
Pan American Games gold medalists for Brazil
Pan American Games medalists in gymnastics
South American Games gold medalists for Brazil
South American Games silver medalists for Brazil
South American Games bronze medalists for Brazil
South American Games medalists in gymnastics
Competitors at the 2014 South American Games
Competitors at the 2018 South American Games
Medalists at the 2011 Pan American Games
21st-century Brazilian people